JV-1-36 is a GHRH antagonist that has been shown to inhibit endometriotic cell proliferation and survival, suggesting that GHRH antagonist may represent promising tools for treatment of endometriosis.

References

Noninflammatory disorders of female genital tract